Gröndal may refer to:

Places
Gröndal, a district of Stockholm
Gröndals IK, a football team
Gröndalsbron, two bridges in central Stockholm
Gröndal, Malmö, a district of Malmö
Gröndal, the official Swedish name of Viherlaakso district, Espoo, Finland

People

Ragnheiður Gröndal (born 1984), Icelandic singer
Benedikt Sigurðsson Gröndal (1924–2010), former Prime Minister of Iceland
Benedikt Sveinbjarnarson Gröndal, illustrator and poet
Þorvaldur Gröndal, drummer for Apparat Organ Quartet

See also
Grøndal station, Copenhagen
Anders Grøndal (born 1984), Norwegian rally and hill climb driver
Grønnedal or Gronnedal or Grondal, former names of Kangilinnguit, Greenland